Thera contractata, known generally as the contracted spanworm or evergreen spanworm, is a species of geometrid moth in the family Geometridae. It is found in North America.

The MONA or Hodges number for Thera contractata is 7218.

References

Further reading

 
 

Hydriomenini
Articles created by Qbugbot
Moths described in 1873